John Peter Grant (21 September 1774 – 17 May 1848) was a Scottish politician from Inverness-shire who sat in the House of Commons for English constituencies between 1812 and 1826.

Life
John Peter Grant was born in 1774. Educated at Edinburgh High School and Edinburgh University, he was a Member of Parliament (MP for Great Grimsby from 1812 to 1818, then for Tavistock from 1819 to 1826.

After leaving Parliament, he became a judge in British India, serving as Puisne judge of Bombay from 1827 to 1830, and of Bengal from 1833 to 1848. His children included Sir John Peter Grant the M.P. and Elizabeth Grant the diarist.

He died on board ship during a return journey to Britain, and was buried at sea.

His wife Jane Ironside Grant is buried against the original north wall of Dean Cemetery in Edinburgh; the gravestone is also a memorial to her husband.

References

External links 
 

1774 births
1848 deaths
British people in colonial India
People from Inverness
Members of the Parliament of the United Kingdom for Great Grimsby
UK MPs 1812–1818
UK MPs 1818–1820
UK MPs 1820–1826
People educated at the Royal High School, Edinburgh
Alumni of the University of Edinburgh
John Peter
Members of the Parliament of the United Kingdom for Tavistock